John Henry Albert "Daisy" Davis (November 28, 1858November 5, 1902) was a right-handed professional baseball pitcher who played at the major league level in 1884 and 1885 for the St. Louis Browns and Boston Beaneaters.

Career
Born in Boston, Massachusetts, Davis made his big league debut on May 6, 1884, for the Browns. In 25 games with them (24 starts), he went 10–12 with 20 complete games and an ERA of 2.90. His 6.49 strikeouts per nine innings pitched were second in the American Association that year, and 4.09 strikeout to walk ratio was eighth. He then appeared in four games for the Beaneaters, completing all of them but going only 1–3 with a 7.84 ERA. Overall, he went 11–15 with 23 complete games in 29 games (28 starts). He had a 3.57 ERA.

In 1885, he appeared in 11 games, completing 10 of them. He went 5–6 with a 4.29 ERA.
He played his final game on July 29. Overall, Davis went 16–21 with a 3.78 ERA in 40 games. He completed 33 of the games he pitched. As a batter, he hit .157 in 140 at-bats, and he had a .826 fielding percentage. Statistically, he is most similar to Stan Yerkes, according to the Similarity Scores at Baseball-Reference.com.

Following his death of consumption at the age of 43, he was interred at Pine Grove Cemetery in Lynn.

References

External links

1858 births
1902 deaths
Major League Baseball pitchers
19th-century baseball players
St. Louis Browns players
Boston Beaneaters players
Baseball players from Boston
Syracuse Stars (minor league baseball) players
Toronto Canucks players
Portsmouth Lillies players
American expatriate baseball players in Canada
20th-century deaths from tuberculosis
Tuberculosis deaths in Massachusetts